Anna Ziegler is an American playwright.

She was educated at Saint Ann's School, studied English at Yale University, earned an MA in poetry from the University of East Anglia in 2002, and an MFA in dramatic writing from New York University in 2004.

In 2015, Ziegler's play Photograph 51, about the part played by Rosalind Franklin in the discovery of the structure of DNA, was staged in London's West End, with Nicole Kidman in the role of Franklin. Kidman won The Evening Standard Award for Best Actress for her performance.

In The New York Times, in 2015, Ziegler was described as "newly (and justly) hot" and her writing as "lyrical...[with] a luminous beauty."

Plays
Actually (2017) – co world-premiere productions at the Geffen Playhouse, Williamstown Theatre Festival and Manhattan Theatre Club, 2017
Another Way Home (2011)
BFF (2007)
Boy (2015)—nominee for 2016 Outer Critics Circle John Gassner award
A Delicate Ship (2015)  – premiere at The Playwrights Realm
Dov and Ali (2008) – productions at The Playwrights Realm in New York, 2009 and Theatre 503 in London, 2008
The Great Moment (2019) – premiere at Seattle Repertory Theatre
The Last Match (2015) – production at Roundabout Theatre Company, Fall 2017
Life Science (2007)
The Minotaur (2018)
Photograph 51 (2008) – winner 2016 WhatsOnStage Award for Best New Play
The Wanderers (2020)

References

1979 births
Living people
Yale College alumni
Alumni of the University of East Anglia
Tisch School of the Arts alumni
21st-century American dramatists and playwrights
21st-century American women writers
American women dramatists and playwrights
Writers from Brooklyn
Saint Ann's School (Brooklyn) alumni